National Highway 71 (NH 71) (previously National Highway 205) is a National Highway in India, that lies completely in the state of Andhra Pradesh. This highway passes through Temple city Tirupati and connects with Coastal Andhra Pradesh.  The western terminal starts at the junction of National Highway 42 near Madanapalle and terminates at the junction of National Highway 16 near Naidupeta in the east.

Route 

It starts at Madanapalle and passes through Vayalpad, Kalikiri, Pileru, Tirupati, Renigunta, and Yerpedu before it ends at Nayudupeta road.

Junctions  
 
  Terminal near Madanapalle
  near Pileru
  near Tirupati
  near Renigunta
  near Yerpedu
  Terminal near Nayudupeta

See also 
 List of National Highways in India by highway number
 List of National Highways in India by state

References

External links 
 NH 71 on OpenStreetMap

71
71
National highways in India